The AK-63 (also known in Hungarian military service as the AMM) is a Hungarian variant of the AKM assault rifle manufactured by the Fegyver- és Gépgyár (FÉG) state arms plant in Hungary. It is currently used by the Hungarian Ground Forces as its standard infantry weapon, and by most other branches of the Hungarian Defence Forces.

In Hungarian service, the AK-63 replaced the AMD-65, which is nearly identical but features a modified heat shield and a vertical forward hand grip under the barrel. Although the AMD-65 had been the Hungarian service rifle since 1965, it was more expensive to build, and the forward grips had a reputation for being easily damaged in the field. In the late-1970s, the Hungarian Defense Ministry requested that FÉG manufacture a cheaper rifle based on the more traditional Soviet AKM design. By the end of 1977, the AK-63 was adopted by the Hungarian People's Army (beginning with the Ground Forces). In 1978, FÉG added a folding stock AKMS version of the AK-63 to their catalogue; thereafter, the fixed-stock AK-63 became known as the AK-63F (Wooden Stock) and the folding-stock version was designated AK-63D (Descent).

In Hungarian service, the AK-63 F and D are designated as the AMM and AMMS, respectively.

Features
The AK-63 F and D (AMM and AMMS) are both nearly identical externally to the USSR-manufactured AKM and AKMS. The main difference is that the AK-63 series retains the distinctive-looking straight pistol grip of the AKM-63. The forward hand grip of the AK-63 also lacks the palm swells which characterize the Soviet AKM (and most AKM copies made in many other countries). It's also missing the stepped lightening cut on the bolt carrier and retains the relief ports on the gas tube. The wood on the AK-63, like that of the AKM-63, has a bright, laminated blond finish.

Export users

During the Cold War and afterwards, the AK-63 series was widely exported to a number of nations in Eastern Europe, the Middle East, Africa, and South America.

Iraq under Saddam Hussein was the first major export customer to receive the AK-63, which it began importing in large numbers in 1979 to equip its armed forces. These rifles made their combat debut in the hands of Iraqi soldiers during the Iran–Iraq War in 1980–1988. During the war, the Iranian Revolutionary Guards and many of the local militias which participated in the fighting were also armed with AK-63s; these were most likely acquired by capturing them from the Iraqis (since Iran mostly purchased AKs from China and North Korea, and received some Soviet weapons from Libya and Syria). The AK-63 was used by Iraqi forces again during the Gulf War in 1990–91, and later turned up in Kurdish and Shi'ite hands during the insurrections in Iraq throughout the 1990s.

The AK-63 was also exported to the Sandinista government in Nicaragua, which used them to fight the Contras in the 1980s. Significant numbers of AK-63s were also sent to the FMLN in nearby El Salvador starting in late 1984 or 1985. One estimate suggested that about 11,000 AK-63 rifles may have been sent to the region over a five-year period. Since the end of the Cold War, the AK-63 has also turned up regularly in the hands of militants in Somalia and Zambia, and was also purchased by Croatian forces for use during the Croatian War of Independence. Photographic evidence shows that the AK-63 is one of the primary rifles in use by the Kurdish YPG/YPJ and PKK forces in Syria and Iraq.

In 1985, a semi-automatic version of the AK-63 was exported to the United States for civilian consumption. Imported by Kassnar (of Harrisburg, PA), which sold it as the SA-85M, it was only available in its "pre-ban" form for a few years before the 1989 assault weapons importation ban. Since only about 7,000 pre-ban SA-85Ms were imported prior to 1989, it is now considered a collector's item amongst firearms enthusiasts and commands high prices (often $1,500 or higher). The post-ban version of the SA-85M, featuring a thumbhole stock, was discontinued after only a few years of importation. However, in recent years, several companies in the United States have built clones of these rifles from Hungarian parts kits on American-made receivers.

Variants
 AK-63F (AMM in Hungarian service): The basic fixed-stock copy of the Soviet AKM.
 AK-63D (AMMS in Hungarian service): An AKMS copy with an under-folding steel stock.
 AK-63MF: Modernised AK-63D with telescopic stock and MIL-STD-1913 Swan rail.
 SA-85M: A semi-automatic-only version intended for civilian sales in the United States; imported by Kassnar in both pre- and post-ban versions.
 SA-2000S: Federal Assault Weapons ban-era version with single stack magazine. Exclusively for the US market.

AK-63MF
7700 pieces of the AK-63 have been modernised in the Hungarian Armed Forces and received the designation AK-63MF.

The modernisation included Swan rails, new handgrips, underbarrel grenade launcher, new sights, flashlights etc.
 CAA CBS+ACP telescopic stock
 Brügger & Thomet BT-21428 gas block
 Side mount (unknown type)
 Heckler & Koch M320 Grenade Launcher Module
 Aimpoint CompM2 sight (B&T BT-21741 QD ring 30 mm ultrahigh heavy type)
 Aimpont 3× magnification sight (B&T BT-211115 Flip-side QD base mount, B&T BT-211113 Flip-side QD ring)
 Insight Technology AN/PEQ-2 Target Pointer/Illuminator/Aiming Light (TPIAL) laser sight
 CAA BP Grip with bipod
 CAA AG47 handgrip

Users
 
 
  National Civilian police since 2014 and the Armed Forces since 1992.
 : Main service rifle of the Hungarian Defence Forces. Intended to be replaced by the CZ BREN 2.
 : Captured during 1980s from Iraqi Army.
 
: Used in small number 
 
 
 
 
 : In use by Army
 : Used by the Zimbabwe National Army Parachute Regiment

Non-State Users
 
  Kurdistan Workers' Party
  Liberation Tigers of Tamil Eelam

Gallery

See also
 List of assault rifles

References

Further reading
 Weapons of the FMLN-Part Two: The Logistics of an Insurgency By Lawrence J. Whelan

7.62×39mm assault rifles
Rifles of the Cold War
Hungary–Soviet Union relations
Infantry weapons of the Cold War
Kalashnikov derivatives
Assault rifles of Hungary
Fegyver- és Gépgyár firearms
Military equipment introduced in the 1970s